Shivgad Fort   is a fort located 89km from Kolhapur, in Kolhapur district, of Maharashtra. This fort was an important fort in Kolhapur district as a watch over for the Phonda ghat trade route from Kolhapur to coastal ports. The fort is surrounded by thick forest and hill slopes.

History
Ramchandra Pant Amatya was one of the eleven feudatories (Jehagirs)  who controlled shivgad along with Gagangad fort.  This fort was under the control of Pant Amatya of Gaganbawda, till the Indian independence.

How to reach from mumbai
The nearest town is Radhanagari which is 61km from Kolhapur. The base village of the fort is Dajipur which is 32km from Radhanagari. The fort can also be trekked from base village Gadgesakhal which is below Phondaghat. It takes about 2 hours to reach from this village. There are good hotels at Radhanagari, now tea and snacks are also available in small hotels at Dajipur and forest check post at Thakyachapada. The trekking path starts from the hillock west of the forest check post. The route is very safe and passes through dense jungle. It takes about an hour to reach the entrance gate of the fort. There is no water on the fort so, the night stay on the fort can not be made. The villagers from the forest check post make night stay and food arrangements at reasonable cost.

Places to see
There is one dilapidated gate on the main entrance path of the fort. There are two bastions and a UgvaiDevi sati shila on the fort.

Gallery

See also 
 List of forts in Maharashtra
 List of forts in India
Ramchandra Pant Amatya
 Marathi People
 List of Maratha dynasties and states
 Maratha War of Independence
 Battles involving the Maratha Empire
 Maratha Army
 Maratha titles
 Military history of India
 List of people involved in the Maratha Empire

References 

Buildings and structures of the Maratha Empire
16th-century forts in India
Forts in Kolhapur district